DYOW (900 AM) Bombo Radyo is a radio station owned and operated by Bombo Radyo Philippines through its licensee People's Broadcasting Service. Its studio and transmitter are located at Bombo Radyo Broadcast Center, Arnaldo Blvd., Roxas, Capiz.

References

Radio stations in Capiz
Radio stations established in 1993
News and talk radio stations in the Philippines